Gustavo Javier Bartelt (born 2 September 1974) is an Argentine former footballer who played as a forward.

Career
Bartelt started playing for All Boys in 1993. He then played for Lanús, Roma, Aston Villa (on loan from Roma), Rayo, Gimnasia La Plata, Talleres and Gimnasia de Jujuy.

While at Roma, both Bartelt and Cafu were accused of using false documents to gain Italian passports. Bartelt was banned for one year and Cafu was acquitted. He never played for Roma again until released in 2003 and until 2006 was acquitted by the court for the fake documents charge.

The forward retired playing for All Boys in 2009. However, in 2011 he came out of retirement to play again for that club, but this time in the Primera División.

Coaching career
In February 2019, Bartelt was appointed joint-manager alongside Pablo Solchaga for All Boys. The duo was fired on 15 September 2019.

References

External links
 Argentine Primera statistics at Fútbol XXI 

1974 births
Living people
Association football forwards
Argentine footballers
Argentine football managers
All Boys footballers
Club Atlético Lanús footballers
A.S. Roma players
Aston Villa F.C. players
Rayo Vallecano players
Club de Gimnasia y Esgrima La Plata footballers
Talleres de Córdoba footballers
Gimnasia y Esgrima de Jujuy footballers
Argentine expatriate footballers
Expatriate footballers in Italy
Expatriate footballers in Spain
Expatriate footballers in England
Argentine Primera División players
Serie A players
La Liga players
Argentine expatriate sportspeople in Italy
Argentine expatriate sportspeople in Spain
Argentine expatriate sportspeople in England
All Boys managers
Footballers from Buenos Aires